Regina Bogat (born 1928) is an American abstract artist currently living and working in New Jersey. Married to artist Alfred Jensen, her own artwork was often overlooked in favor of her husband's, although her work has experienced renewed interest from the art world during the past decade. She is best known for the abstract paintings she made in the 1960s and 1970s using cords, wooden strips, and colorful threads.

Personal life 
Bogat was born in Brooklyn, New York and studied at the Art Students League of New York while also attending Brooklyn College. Bogat was a docent at the Whitney for several years. In 1948, Bogat married photographer Louis Dienes, but the pair later divorced. After her divorce, Bogat moved into a studio on the Bowery in lower Manhattan, where she first met Mark Rothko, who had a studio on the same floor. In 1962, Bogat moved her studio to Division Street in Chinatown. After a solo show featuring her work was cancelled, Bogat decided to hang the exhibition in her Chinatown studio, inviting her circle of artist friends to attend. It was at this party where she met Alfred Jensen, 25 years her senior and already an established artist, whom she married in 1963. During this time in New York, she also befriended Elaine de Kooning, Eva Hesse, Ad Reinhardt, Claes Oldenburg, and choreographers Trisha Brown and Yvonne Rainer.

In 1972, Bogat, with her husband and their two children, moved to New Jersey. After moving to New Jersey, she completed her bachelor's degree at Rutgers University.

Career 
Bogat has been productive throughout her entire career and continues to make work today.  She has exhibited in the United States and in Europe and her work is included in museum collections. She was included in the 1973 exhibition, Women choose Women curated by Lucy Lippard at the New York Cultural Center. In 2014, the Blanton Museum (Austin, TX) acquired a major work Cord Painting 14, 1977.  In 2015, Regina Bogat was invited by Sarah Cain to be part of her solo exhibition, SARAH CAIN Blue in your Body, Red when it hits the Air, at the Museum of Contemporary Art, San Diego, CA. In 2017, Karen Wright invited Regina Bogat to participate in Entangled: Threads & Making at the Turner Contemporary, Margate, UK. In 2017, Kelly Baum, a curator of contemporary art at The Metropolitan Museum of Art (NY) included Regina in the major exhibition, Delirious: Art at the Limits of Reason, 1950 – 1980 at the Met Breuer with Cord Painting 15, 1977, a work which had just been acquired by The Metropolitan Museum. In 2017, her work The Phoenix and The Mountain no.2, 1980, was acquired by the Centre Pompidou. In 2019, she was elected as a member of the National Academy of Design.

Exhibitions 
Regina Bogat: Ascension (2005 - 2008), Zürcher Gallery, New York City, 2019
Postwar Women, Art Students League of NY, New York City, 2019
Three Americans from New York, Galerie La Forest Divonne, Brussels, 2019
Delirious: Art at the Limits of Reason, The Metropolitan Museum of Art, New York City, 2018
Entangled: Threads and Making, Turner Contemporary, Margate, UK, 2018
Regina Bogat: Bogat in The 90s: The Decade of Deconstruction, Zürcher Gallery, New York City, 2018
 Regina Bogat: Phoenix and the Mountain, 1980 and New Paintings from 2013 – 2015, Galerie Zürcher, Paris, 2016
East West: Confluences of thinking from Mengei to Modernism and Beyond, Dorsky Curatorial Programs, LIC, NY, 2016
 Regina Bogat: Works from the 70s and 80s, Zürcher Gallery, New York City, 2015
 SARAH CAIN: blue in your body, red when it hits the air, Museum of Contemporary Art San Diego, La Jolla, California, 2015	
 Regina Bogat: Work – 1967-1977, Zürcher Gallery, New York City, 2014
 Regina Bogat: The New York Years, 1960-1970, Galerie Zürcher, Paris, 2014
 I was a double, Tang Museum, Saratoga Springs, New York, 2014
If You’re Accidentally Not Included, Don’t Worry About It, curated by Peter Saul, Zürcher Gallery, New York City, 2014
 Regina Bogat: The New York Years, 1960-1970, Zürcher Gallery, New York City, 2013
 Regina Bogat: Stars Art 101, Brooklyn, NY, 2012
 Vertical: New Paintings by Regina Bogat and Fausto Sevila, Simon Liu Gallery, Brooklyn, New York, 2006
 Regina Bogat, Selected Works, New Jersey State Museum, Trenton, New Jersey, 1994
 Memorial Boxes, Soho 20 Gallery Invitational Space, New York City, 1984
 Regina Bogat: Paintings and Box Constructions, Sid Deutsch, New York City, 1983
 Regina Bogat, Women Artists Series at Douglass College, Mabel Smith Douglass Library, Rutgers, The State University of New Jersey, New Brunswick, 1982
 Regina Bogat: The Phoenix and the Mountain, Wenger Gallery, La Jolla, California, 1980–81
Women—Self Image, Women's Interart Center, New York City, 1974
 Women Choose Women curated by Lucy Lippard, New York Cultural Center, New York City, 1973
American Works on Paper, Baden-Baden Museum, Baden-Baden, Germany, 1970
Collection of Dr. and Mrs. Max Welti, Kunstmuseum, Zurich, Switzerland, 1963
 Regina Bogat, Ferrell Galleries, El Paso, TX, 1962
ART:USA 58, Madison Square Garden, New York City, 1958-1959
 Regina Bogat: New Paintings, Terrain Gallery, New York City, 1956

References 

1928 births
Living people
American women painters
Art Students League of New York alumni
Brooklyn College alumni
Artists from Brooklyn
People from Glen Ridge, New Jersey
Painters from New York City
Painters from New Jersey
20th-century American painters
21st-century American painters
20th-century American women artists
21st-century American women artists